Édouard Osoque Mendy (born 1 March 1992) is a professional footballer who plays as a goalkeeper for  club Chelsea and the Senegal national team.

Starting his career in his native France, Mendy played in the Le Havre academy before signing professional terms with third division Cherbourg in 2011. Mendy was released in 2014, after which he almost quit football, before getting an opportunity with Marseille's reserves. He established himself as regular in the following seasons at Reims and Rennes.

In September 2020, Mendy signed for Premier League side Chelsea for a fee reported of £22 million. In his first season, he immediately broke into the starting line-up, becoming the first African goalkeeper to play for the club's senior team, and kept sixteen clean sheets in the Premier League. Mendy also equalled the record for the most clean sheets in a UEFA Champions League season with nine, and kept another clean sheet in the final to help Chelsea win their second title. He was also awarded both the UEFA Goalkeeper of the Year and The Best FIFA Goalkeeper of 2021, becoming the first African goalkeeper in football's history to win both awards. 

Eligible to play for Guinea-Bissau, Senegal, and France, Mendy initially joined Guinea-Bissau in honour of his father, but subsequently switched allegiance to Senegal, where he became the first choice keeper for the 2019 Africa Cup of Nations, helping Senegal to a runners-up finish. He helped his nation win the 2021 Africa Cup of Nations, while also being named the tournament's best goalkeeper, keeping a clean sheet in the final.

Early life
Mendy was born in Montivilliers (Seine-Maritime, Normandy) in France. He is a cousin of left-back Ferland Mendy, who plays for Real Madrid and the France national team.

Club career

Early career
Mendy joined the youth academy of Le Havre AC at the age of 13. After being stuck behind Zacharie Boucher in the talent pool, Mendy dropped down levels to play with CS Municipaux Le Havre. He started his professional career at AS Cherbourg, who were then in the Championnat National, the third tier of the French football league system. He stayed in Cherbourg until the summer of 2014, after which he was without a club for a year. "I did genuinely have my doubts about whether I would carry on," Mendy said in a later interview. At the age of 22, Mendy registered for unemployment and began to look for jobs outside of football. However, in 2015, Mendy was recommended to fill a goalkeeping vacancy at Marseille by friend and former teammate Ted Lavie.  After one phone call with the academy goalkeeping coach, Dominique Bernatowicz, Marseille signed Mendy as their fourth choice goalkeeper. He played the 2015–16 season in Marseille's reserve team, primarily as a backup to Florian Escales.

Reims
In search of regular playing time, Mendy joined Reims during the 2016–17 Ligue 2 season. On the opening day of the season, Mendy made his debut when Reims' starting goalkeeper Johann Carrasso was sent off five minutes into the match against Amiens. Mendy went on to keep three clean sheets over his next seven games. The next season, Mendy cemented his role as the starting goalkeeper on a team for the first time, as he helped Reims win the 2017–18 Ligue 2 title as they were promoted to Ligue 1 for the following season. Mendy kept 18 clean sheets in his 34 appearances over the course of the season. In the 2018–19 season, Mendy played in all 38 Ligue 1 games, as newly promoted Reims soared to an eighth-place finish. Mendy kept fourteen clean sheets, the third highest of any goalkeeper in the league.

Rennes
Mendy joined Rennes in August 2019 for an undisclosed fee, rumoured to be in the region of €4 million, replacing departing goalkeeper Tomáš Koubek. Mendy made his debut on Matchday 3 against Strasbourg after recovering from a broken finger. He saved a penalty to preserve a clean sheet as Rennes won 2–0 at the Stade de la Meinau. Mendy went on to keep nine clean sheets in 24 league matches for Rennes in a season that was shortened due to the COVID-19 pandemic, helping them to a third-place finish and qualification for the UEFA Champions League.

Chelsea

2020–21 season
English club Chelsea signed Mendy on a five-year contract in September 2020, for a fee reported to be £22 million. On 29 September, Mendy made his debut for the club against Tottenham Hotspur in the fourth round of the EFL Cup, which Chelsea lost 5–4 on penalties after a 1–1 draw. Mendy made his Premier League debut on 3 October, keeping a clean sheet in Chelsea's 4–0 victory over Crystal Palace, becoming the first African goalkeeper to play in the division since Carl Ikeme in 2012. 

His clean sheet against Burnley on 31 October made him the first Chelsea goalkeeper to keep a clean sheet in their first three Premier League matches since Petr Čech in 2004. With a clean sheet in the club's next match, a 3–0 win against Mendy's former club Rennes in the Champions League, Chelsea recorded five consecutive clean sheets for the first time in a decade.

On 8 May 2021, Mendy saved a panenka style penalty-kick from Sergio Agüero as Chelsea came from 0–1 down to defeat Manchester City 2–1. Three weeks later on 29 May, Mendy became the first African goalkeeper to play in a final of the UEFA Champions League and the first since Bruce Grobbelaar, who appeared in the 1985 European Cup Final. Chelsea defeated Manchester City 1–0 in the final. He also equaled the record of most clean sheets in a Champions League season, by keeping nine clean sheets, the same as Santiago Cañizares in 2000–01 and Keylor Navas in 2015–16.

2021–22 season
Mendy started the UEFA Super Cup tie against Villarreal, making important saves in the tie that went to extra time. He was replaced by Kepa Arrizabalaga for the penalty shoot-out, which Chelsea went on to win for a second Super Cup title.

Mendy finished second in the Yashin Award to Italy goalkeeper Gianluigi Donnarumma, who saved two penalties in the Euro 2020 final. Mendy did, however, win the FIFA Best Goalkeeper award.

In February 2022, after winning the 2021 Africa Cup of Nations with Senegal, Mendy returned from international duty to take part in the 2021 FIFA Club World Cup, starting in the final as he won a second trophy in two weeks.

International career

Mendy was born to a Senegalese mother and a Bissau-Guinean father in France. In November 2016, he was called up by Guinea-Bissau to play friendly matches against Portuguese clubs Belenenses and Estoril. At the time, his father was very ill and was about to pass away, leading Mendy to honour him playing for the Bissau-Guinean national team. Shortly after, he was shortlisted by Guinea-Bissau to play the 2017 Africa Cup of Nations for them, but he ultimately rejected the call and pledged his future to Senegal.

Mendy made his debut for Senegal in a 1–0 win over Equatorial Guinea on 18 November 2018. Mendy went on to become Senegal's first choice goalkeeper leading up to the 2019 Africa Cup of Nations. He started in both Senegal's opening two group stage matches, a 2–0 win over Tanzania and a 1–0 defeat to Algeria. However, he was injured during the warmups before Senegal's final group stage match against Kenya, and was forced to withdraw from the squad with a broken finger as Senegal would go on to lose in the final 1–0 to Algeria. 

In January 2022, Mendy was included in Senegal's squad for the 2021 Africa Cup of Nations in Cameroon. In his first game at the competition, on 10 January against Zimbabwe, he kept a clean sheet in a 1–0 win for Senegal. After the group stages, Mendy helped his nation to progress into the final. 
At the final on 6 February, against Egypt at Olembe Stadium, following a goaless draw after extra-time, Mendy saved a spot kick from Mohanad Lasheen and another hit the post during the penalty shootout to win the tournament for Senegal for the first time. For his performances throughout the competition, including keeping four clean sheets, he was named the tournament's best goalkeeper.

Style of play
Mendy has been described as a physically dominant goalkeeper who exerts a strong influence in the defensive third. In the 2019–20 season with Rennes, Mendy recorded a 75.3% save success rate, the highest in Ligue 1, averaging 2.5 saves per game. In the same season, Mendy completed 51.4% of his passes over 40 yards, the same as Ederson, who is highly regarded for his kicking ability. Mendy is an aerially assertive goalkeeper, frequently coming off his line to claim crosses. He is also very vocal, often organizing his defenders' positioning. Upon his arrival at Chelsea, former manager Frank Lampard praised his positive attitude and work ethic.

Personal life
In 2021, Édouard Mendy and Ferland Mendy criticised the British and French press for wrongly using their images in stories about Benjamin Mendy, who had been charged with sexual offences. Édouard Mendy said that the errors were "highly symbolic" of how black men are treated in those countries. Agence France-Presse apologised for the error.

Career statistics

Club

International

Honours
Reims
Ligue 2: 2017–18

Chelsea
UEFA Champions League: 2020–21
UEFA Super Cup: 2021 
FIFA Club World Cup: 2021
FA Cup runner-up: 2020–21, 2021–22
EFL Cup runner-up: 2021–22

Senegal
Africa Cup of Nations: 2021; runner-up: 2019

Individual
UEFA Champions League Squad of the Season: 2020–21
Ghana Football Awards Best African International: 2021
UEFA Champions League Goalkeeper of the Season: 2020–21
The Best FIFA Men's Goalkeeper: 2021
Africa Cup of Nations Best Goalkeeper: 2021
Africa Cup of Nations Team of the Tournament: 2021

References

External links

Profile at the Chelsea F.C. website

1992 births
Living people
People from Montivilliers
Sportspeople from Seine-Maritime
Footballers from Normandy
French footballers
Senegalese footballers
Association football goalkeepers
AS Cherbourg Football players
Olympique de Marseille players
Stade de Reims players
Stade Rennais F.C. players
Chelsea F.C. players
Championnat National players
Championnat National 2 players
Ligue 2 players
Ligue 1 players
Premier League players
FA Cup Final players
UEFA Champions League winning players
Senegal international footballers
2019 Africa Cup of Nations players
2021 Africa Cup of Nations players
2022 FIFA World Cup players
Africa Cup of Nations-winning players
French expatriate footballers
Senegalese expatriate footballers
Expatriate footballers in England
French expatriate sportspeople in England
Senegalese expatriate sportspeople in England
Black French sportspeople
French sportspeople of Bissau-Guinean descent
French sportspeople of Senegalese descent
Senegalese people of Bissau-Guinean descent
Sportspeople of Bissau-Guinean descent
Citizens of Senegal through descent